The Gallox Bridge in Dunster, Somerset, England dates from the 15th century. It has been designated as a Grade I listed building and scheduled monument. The bridge is in the guardianship of English Heritage.

The stone packhorse bridge crosses the River Avill at the southern end of the village, below Dunster Castle at a point which may have been the limit of tidal flow during the medieval period. It was important for the transport of wool and other goods to the market within the village which was established by 1222. The name is derived from the nearby gallows. The narrow bridge is approach via a raised causeway for pedestrians, while wheeled traffic uses the adjacent ford.

History
The bridge crosses the River Avill which rises on the eastern slopes of Dunkery Beacon and flows north through Timberscombe and Dunster flowing into the Bristol Channel at Dunster Beach. It is likely that there was a previous bridge on the same site as in the 14th century it was known as Doddebrigge. The bridge may have been at the limit of the tidal mouth of the river during the medieval period.

Dunster had become a centre for woollen and clothing production by the 13th century, with the market dating back to at least 1222, and a particular kind of kersey or broadcloth became known as 'Dunsters'. The prosperity of Dunster was based on the wool trade, with profits helping to pay for the construction of the tower of the Priory Church of St George and provide other amenities.

The name Gallox is believed to be derived from gallows as the village gallows were nearby, when it was called Gallocksbrigge. The bridge is close to Dunster Working Watermill and the base of the hill on which Dunster Castle sits and provides access to the site of the Deer park. It also falls within the Dunster Conservation Area. It has been in the guardianship of English Heritage since the 1950s.

Architecture
It is a narrow stone packhorse bridge, on the southern outskirts of Dunster, with two arches over the River Avill. The side of the bridge each have four narrow chamfered ribs. The approach from the village is via a raised causeway.

See also
 Grade I listed buildings in West Somerset
 List of English Heritage properties in Somerset

References

External links

History of Dunster Gallox Bridge: English Heritage

Bridges completed in the 15th century
Grade I listed buildings in West Somerset
Scheduled monuments in West Somerset
Bridges in Somerset
English Heritage sites in Somerset
Grade I listed bridges
Packhorse bridges